Qian Nengxun (1869 – June 5, 1924), courtesy name Ganchen or Gancheng was a Chinese politician from 1918 until his death in 1924. He served as the Premier of the Republic of China twice during the Warlord Era, in 1918 and 1919 and was the protegee of former president Xu Shichang. In 1922, Qian co-founded the charitable Red Swastika Society.

References 

1869 births
1924 deaths
Qing dynasty politicians from Zhejiang
Chinese police officers
Republic of China politicians from Zhejiang
Politicians from Jiaxing
Premiers of the Republic of China
Political office-holders in Shaanxi